David Vseviov (born as David Isaakovich Vseviov on 27 May 1949) is an Estonian historian and pedagogue.

Career 
David Vseviov was 27 born May 1949 in Estonia. Vseviov speaks both Estonian and Russian fluently and is of Jewish heritage on the side of his father Isaac Vseviov and mother Rezi Vseviova.

In 1966 he graduated from the Tallinn Secondary School No. 6 (now the Tallinn Central Russian Gymnasium), and in 1971 from the Faculty of History and Linguistics of Tartu State University as a historian and history teacher. Since 1986 he is teaching art history and visual culture at Estonian Academy of Arts (professor).

For over 20 years he has hosted the radio program Müstiline Venemaa ('Mysterious Russia').

Married, has three children. His son Jonatan has worked in the Estonian Ministry of Defense and foreign ministry.

Awards 
 Estonian Opinion Leader of the Year
 European Parliament's 2016 European Citizen's Prize
 National Culture Award of the Republic of Estonia
 2001: Order of the White Star, V class.

References

Living people
1949 births
20th-century Estonian historians
Estonian radio people
21st-century Estonian historians
Tallinn University alumni
University of Tartu alumni
Academic staff of the Estonian Academy of Arts
Estonian radio personalities
Recipients of the Order of the White Star, 5th Class
Estonian Jews